Road signs in Ukraine are governed by a combination of standards set out by the Vienna Convention on Road Signs and Signals, the European Union, and Ukraine Transport and Roads Agency. Ukrainian signs are similar to the signs of post-Soviet states (e.g. Lithuania) and are set out in 7 separate categories based on meaning: Warning, priority, prohibitory, mandatory, information, guide, and additional plates. Despite this, the traffic signs in Ukraine appear to be different from those used in neighboring Russia, Belarus, Moldova, and other post-Soviet states.

Ukraine drives on the right as with the rest of Europe, except for Cyprus, Ireland, Malta and the United Kingdom.

The state importance roads have different indexes, each stand for the respective letter of Cyrillic.

Also, Ukrainian road signs were used in the Autonomous Republic of Crimea and Sevastopol before their occupation and subsequent annexation by Russia in 2014. After the annexation of the Crimean peninsula by Russia, Ukrainian road signs began to be removed and replaced with Russian ones. In some cases, road signs in Ukrainian were removed from Crimea, while in others the text was changed from Ukrainian to Russian, including the names of settlements.

On November 1, 2021 a new standard of road signs in Ukraine was introduced. According to the new standard, signs will be easier to read, and their accumulation is prohibited. The main difference is that the names of settlements will have a different font and will be capitalized, not uppercased. There is also a new typeface, called Road UA, that will be used. The new standard provides:

 Layout of road signs of individual design according to the new principle;
 The text must begin with a capital letter;
 Arrows have a new shape;
 European symbols are used to indicate the center of the settlement and the river;
 Defined clear proportions and distances between the elements, depending on the size of the capital letter, which is chosen based on the location of the sign and the category of the road;
 Transliteration of names of settlements is provided.

In addition, this standard will have a new designation of diagonal pedestrian crossings and a new sign for safety islands. Signs and signs to road signs for the development of cycling infrastructure will also be updated.

Warning signs 
Warning signs are an upward-pointing red triangle, with white backgrounds and black pictograms. Yellow backgrounds are used for temporary dangers or roadworks conditions. Signs may include additional plates detailing the danger, who the signs apply to, or other necessary information.

Priority signs 
Priority signs regulate the movement of vehicles in an orderly fashion. The priority road sign tells drives that they have priority at all intersections ahead on the road until the end sign. The traffic bottleneck signs are used where the road is too narrow to permit vehicles to pass side-by-side, but rather must alternate.

Prohibitory signs 
Prohibitory signs regulate the use of the road based on movement, classes of vehicles, or other restrictions.

Mandatory signs 
Mandatory signs instruct drivers on actions they must take or obey, or may mark types of vehicles permitted to use the road.

Information signs 
Information signs describe conditions of the road and area that do not require a danger warning, mandatory instruction or prohibition.

Guide signs 
Guide signs mark the way to road services that may be required by the driver. They may include arrows, distances to, or names of the service.

Additional Plates 
Additional plates provide extra information about the sign above it.

See also 
 Comparison of European traffic laws
 Comparison of European road signs
 Traffic sign
 Vienna Convention on Road Signs and Signals

References 

Road transport in Ukraine
Ukraine